Zack Henry (born 1 October 1994) is an English professional rugby player currently playing for Section Paloise in France's Top 14, he has previously played for Leicester Tigers in Premiership Rugby. His position is Fly-half, he also plays at fullback.

Career
Henry played for the University of Bath and was selected for Team GB in the World University 7s Championships in which he claimed a silver medal, losing to Australia in the final. After his three years at the University of Bath, he gained a Masters Degree at University of the West of England, Bristol

Henry spent four seasons in France and made a name for himself with coach Richard Hill at French side Rouen for the 2016–17 and 2017-18 seasons before being picked up by Pro D2 side Nevers and was since recognised as one of the top performers in the Pro D2.

On 25 February 2020, it was announced Zack returns to his home nation in England to join Leicester Tigers in the Premiership Rugby from the 2020-21 season.  Henry made his Leicester debut on 15 August 2021 as a replacement against Exeter, and played 26 times for Leicester in his single year at the club.

On 9 June 2021, it was announced that Henry would return to France to join Top 14 side Pau ahead of the 2021-22 season.

Personal life
Jake Henry, the brother of Zack, also plays professional rugby in the English RFU Championship.

References

External links
 Highlights from the French Federation final 10 June 2017
 Bio
 Article
 Transfer
 Successeur

1994 births
Living people
English rugby union players
People educated at Hurstpierpoint College
Team Bath rugby union players
Leicester Tigers players
Rugby union players from Brighton
Rugby union fly-halves